Donte DiVincenzo (born January 31, 1997) is an American professional basketball player for the Golden State Warriors of the National Basketball Association (NBA). He played college basketball for the Villanova Wildcats, where he won national championships in 2016 and 2018. Selected with the 17th overall pick by the Milwaukee Bucks in the 2018 NBA draft, DiVincenzo won his first championship with the Bucks in 2021, before being traded to the Sacramento Kings the following season.

Early life and high school career
DiVincenzo was born in Newark, Delaware, and has an older brother. Growing up, DiVincenzo played soccer before switching to basketball in high school. He attended the Salesianum School, where he led the team to two consecutive state championships. As a junior, he averaged 15.8 points, 4.7 rebounds and 2.9 assists per game and played basketball in the Nike EYBL for Team Final. DiVincenzo averaged 22.9 points, 9.0 rebounds and 4.0 assists per game as a senior. He was named Delaware Sportswriters and Broadcasters Association's Boys' Basketball Player of the Year in 2015.

College career

DiVincenzo appeared in nine games his true freshman year for Villanova before sitting out with a fractured fifth metatarsal bone in his right foot. The following season, in his redshirt freshman season, DiVincenzo averaged 8.8 points and 3.8 rebounds per game. He registered 19 points, three rebounds, and two assists in a 70–57 victory against St. John's on January 14, 2017. On March 9, DiVincenzo had a season-high 25 points to go with five rebounds and four assists in a 108–67 rematch win over St. John's. In the NCAA Tournament, he scored 21 points and grabbed 13 rebounds in a 76–56 victory over Mount St. Mary's in the first round. DiVincenzo was named to the Big East All-Freshman team and the Philadelphia Big Five Rookie of the Year.

In his redshirt sophomore season, DiVincenzo had a then career-high 30 points in an 86–75 win over Butler on February 10, 2018. At the conclusion of the regular season, he was named Big East Sixth Man of the Year. In the Elite Eight of the 2018 NCAA Tournament, DiVincenzo had 12 points and eight rebounds in a 71–59 win over Texas Tech. DiVincenzo was named the NCAA Final Four Most Outstanding Player following their championship win over Michigan, in which he scored a career-high 31 points (including five three-point baskets) and recorded five rebounds, three assists and two blocked shots. In addition, he scored the most points in an NCAA Final Four game for a player coming off the bench.

DiVincenzo was dubbed the "Big Ragu" by sportscaster Gus Johnson following his last-second tip in a game on January 29, 2017, which gave Villanova the win against the University of Virginia. The nickname was given to him ostensibly due to his Italian heritage and his red hair.  When Johnson came up with the nickname, he was probably referring to another "Big Ragu", a character named Carmine Ragusa on the 1970s–80s sitcom Laverne & Shirley, who was also Italian. On April 19, 2018, DiVincenzo announced he would declare for the 2018 NBA draft without hiring an agent, thereby leaving open the possibility of a return to Villanova. On May 29, 2018, DiVincenzo announced he would remain in the draft and hire an agent, forgoing his final two years of eligibility at Villanova.

Professional career

Milwaukee Bucks (2018–2022)
On June 21, 2018, DiVincenzo was selected with the 17th overall pick by the Milwaukee Bucks in the 2018 NBA draft, the second of four Villanova players drafted that year. On July 10, 2018, the Milwaukee Bucks announced that they had signed DiVincenzo. He missed most of his rookie season with a foot injury. He scored a career-high 17 points in a win over the Minnesota Timberwolves in early November during his second season.

On December 16, 2019, DiVincenzo scored 5 points, grabbed 10 rebounds, recorded 9 assists, and recorded 3 steals in a 120–116 loss to the Dallas Mavericks. On January, 16, 2020, DiVincenzo scored 19 points and recorded 3 rebounds in  a 128–123 win against the Boston Celtics. That same season, he would record the 3rd highest defensive rating of any player in the league (teammate Giannis Antetokounmpo being 1st).

On May 4, 2021, DiVincenzo scored 10 points and grabbed 15 rebounds in a 124–118 win over the Brooklyn Nets. He ultimately received a championship ring as he was part of the 2021 team that won the NBA Finals, but did not play in any games after the first round of the playoffs due to a severe left ankle injury suffered against the Miami Heat. His injury was viewed as a hindrance to Milwaukee's ability to find postseason success, as they had not expected to play role players P. J. Tucker and Pat Connaughton so frequently.

On December 25, 2021, DiVincenzo made his return to the court after being out for six months, where he logged 3 points and 2 rebounds in 15 minutes of playing time during a 117–113 win over the Boston Celtics. On January 22, 2022, DiVincenzo scored a season high 20 points in a 133–127 win over the Sacramento Kings.

Sacramento Kings (2022) 
On February 10, 2022, DiVincenzo was traded to the Sacramento Kings in a four-team trade that sent Serge Ibaka to the Bucks. On February 12, DiVincenzo scored 7 points and recorded 5 assists in 19 minutes of playing time in his Kings debut, a 123–110 win over the Washington Wizards.

Golden State Warriors (2022–present)
On July 8, 2022, DiVincenzo signed with the Golden State Warriors on a two-year, $9.3M deal. On January 27, 2023, DiVincenzo scored 12 points and recorded 11 assists during a 129–117 win over the Toronto Raptors. On March 11, DiVincenzo scored 20 points and grabbed 10 rebounds during a 125–116 overtime victory against the Milwaukee Bucks.

Career statistics

NBA

Regular season

|-
| style="text-align:left;"| 
| style="text-align:left;"| Milwaukee
| 27 || 0 || 15.2 || .403 || .265 || .750 || 2.4 || 1.1 || .5 || .2 || 4.9
|-
| style="text-align:left;"| 
| style="text-align:left;"| Milwaukee
| 66 || 24 || 23.0 || .455 || .336 || .733 || 4.8 || 2.3 || 1.3 || .3 || 9.2
|-
| style="text-align:left;background:#afe6ba;"| †
| style="text-align:left;"| Milwaukee
| 66 || 66 || 27.5 || .420 || .379 || .718 || 5.8 || 3.1 || 1.1 || .2 || 10.4
|-
| style="text-align:left;"| 
| style="text-align:left;"| Milwaukee
| 17 || 0 || 20.1 || .331 || .284 || .852 || 3.5 || 1.7 || .6 || .2 || 7.2
|-
| style="text-align:left;"| 
| style="text-align:left;"| Sacramento
| 25 || 1 || 26.6 || .362 || .368 || .839 || 4.4 || 3.6 || 1.5 || .2 || 10.3
|- class="sortbottom"
| style="text-align:center;" colspan="2"|Career
| 201 || 91 || 23.6 || .415 || .347 || .766 || 4.6 || 2.5 || 1.1 || .2 || 9.0

Playoffs

|-
| style="text-align:left;"|2020
| style="text-align:left;"|Milwaukee
| 10 || 1 || 16.5 || .451 || .333 || .650 || 3.2 || 1.2 || .7 || .3 || 6.6
|-
| style="text-align:left;background:#afe6ba;"|2021†
| style="text-align:left;"|Milwaukee
| 3 || 3 || 23.3 || .188 || .167 || .000 || 6.3 || 2.7 || 1.0 || .3 || 2.7
|- class="sortbottom"
| style="text-align:center;" colspan="2"|Career
| 13 || 4 || 18.1 || .388 || .273 || .650 || 3.9 || 1.5 || .8 || .3 || 5.7

College

|-
| style="text-align:left;"|2015–16
| style="text-align:left;"|Villanova
| 9 || 1 || 8.2 || .286 || .176 ||  || 1.8 || .4 || .4 || .0 || 1.7
|-
| style="text-align:left;"|2016–17
| style="text-align:left;"|Villanova
| 36 || 1 || 25.5 || .466 || .365 || .699 || 3.8 || 1.7 || .9 || .3 || 8.8
|-
| style="text-align:left;"|2017–18
| style="text-align:left;"|Villanova
| 40 || 10 || 29.3 || .481 || .401 || .710 || 4.8 || 3.5 || 1.1 || .2 || 13.4
|- class="sortbottom"
| style="text-align:center;" colspan="2"|Career
| 85 || 12 || 25.4 || .469 || .378 || .705 || 4.0 || 2.4 || .9 || .2 || 10.2

References

External links

 Villanova Wildcats bio
 ESPN profile

1997 births
Living people
American men's basketball players
American people of Italian descent
Basketball players from Wilmington, Delaware
Golden State Warriors players
Milwaukee Bucks draft picks
Milwaukee Bucks players
People from Newark, Delaware
Sacramento Kings players
Salesianum School alumni
Shooting guards
Villanova Wildcats men's basketball players
Wisconsin Herd players